Whitesboro was an unincorporated community in Mendocino County, California.

The name was bestowed in 1876 after L. E. White, the major owner of the Salmon Creek Mill Company. A post office operated at Whitesboro from 1881 to 1899. Almost no trace of the former sawmill town remains as of 2010, but there is still a functioning Whitesboro Grange hall located on nearby Navarro Ridge Road.

Images

References

Former populated places in California
Unincorporated communities in California
Unincorporated communities in Mendocino County, California